The Ling Tung Numismatic Museum is a museum about currency in Nantun District, Taichung, Taiwan. The museum is located at Ling Tung University.

History
The museum was founded on 28 October 2006 to celebrate the 4th anniversary of the university.

Exhibitions
The museum houses the private collections of the school president and comprises approximately 4,000 pieces of ancient Chinese coins and paper money. It also has examples of silver ingots and bars that circulated during different dynasties.

See also
 List of museums in Taiwan

References

External links
 

2006 establishments in Taiwan
History museums in Taiwan
Ling Tung University
Museums established in 2006
Museums in Taichung
Numismatic museums in Asia
University museums in Taiwan